Tariq Ahmed Al-Amri (born December 23, 1990) is a Saudi Arabian long-distance runner. He competed at the 2016 Summer Olympics in the men's 5000 metres race; his time of 14:26.90 in the heats did not qualify him for the final.

Al-Amri won bronze in the 5000m at the 2017 Asian Athletics Championships, having finished 9th in the 2016 Asian Indoor Athletics Championships in Doha.

References

1990 births
Living people
Saudi Arabian male long-distance runners
Olympic athletes of Saudi Arabia
Athletes (track and field) at the 2016 Summer Olympics
Athletes (track and field) at the 2014 Asian Games
Athletes (track and field) at the 2018 Asian Games
Asian Games medalists in athletics (track and field)
Asian Games bronze medalists for Saudi Arabia
Medalists at the 2018 Asian Games
21st-century Saudi Arabian people